William Bowles may refer to:
William Bowles (1686–1748), British Member of Parliament for Bewdley and Bridport
William Bowles (naturalist) (1705–1780), Irish naturalist
William Lisle Bowles (1762–1850), English poet and critic
William Augustus Bowles (1763–1805), American adventurer and leader of a short-lived Native American state in southeastern North America
William Bowles (Royal Navy officer) (1780–1869), British admiral
William A. Bowles (1799–1873), American doctor, soldier and Knights of the Golden Circle leader
William Leslie Bowles (1885–1954), Australian sculptor